Patti Catalano Dillon (née Lyons, April 6, 1953) is a former long-distance runner from the United States who is recognized by the International Association of Athletics Federations as having set world bests in the half marathon, 30 kilometers, and 20 kilometers.

Early life
She grew up in Quincy, Massachusetts, in the working-class Houghs Neck neighborhood, the eldest of nine children. Her father was a second-generation Irish immigrant from Dorchester and an all-Navy boxer. Her mother, a Mi'kmaw woman, had run away from home in Nova Scotia when she was 11 and wound up in Quincy working as a nanny after lying about her age.

Running career
Catalano has held the World Record in the marathon and American road records in the marathon, half marathon, 30 kilometers, 15 kilometers, 10 miles, and 5 mile (now 8 kilometers). Described as "one of the most dominating American female road runners of the 1970s" and "the queen of U.S. women distance runners", she was inducted into the National Distance Running Hall of Fame in 2006.

Catalano won five of the first six runnings of the Ocean State Marathon (1976-1979, 1981) and four consecutive at the Honolulu Marathon (1978-1981). Included among the many races she has won are the Montreal International Marathon (1980), Crim 10 miler (1980, 1981), the Crescent City Classic 10 km (1980, 1981), and the Rio de Janeiro Marathon (1985).

Catalono won the Rio de Janeiro Marathon despite getting food poisoning. This was one of her final marathons.

Achievements

Personal life
In 1992, Catalano married the love of her life, Danny Dillon. Dillon was a Big East champion in the 3,000 meters and a cross country All-American at Providence College. As of 2003, they live in New London, Connecticut, with their two children.  Catalano won Best in Show with a French Lop at the Pennsylvania Rabbit Convention.

Notes

References
General

Specific

External links
Patti Catalano Dillon - Official website

Living people
1953 births
American female long-distance runners
American female marathon runners
World record setters in athletics (track and field)
21st-century American women